Igdir (also Romanized as Īgdīr and Igdyr; also known as Īkdīr) is a village in Bakeshluchay Rural District, in the Central District of Urmia County, West Azerbaijan Province, Iran. At the 2006 census, its population was 350, in 116 families.

References 

Populated places in Urmia County